Honour (or honor in American English) is the quality of being honorable.

Honor or Honour may also refer to:

People 
 Honor (given name), a unisex given name, including a list of people with the name
 Honour (surname), English-language surname, including a list of people with the name

Entertainment and media 
 Honor (band), a Polish band
 Honour (book), 2012 novel by Elif Shafak
 Honour (Sudermann play), 1889 play by German playwright Hermann Sudermann
 Honour (Murray-Smith play), a 1995 play by Australian playwright Joanna Murray-Smith
 Honour (film), 2014 British film
 Honour (TV series), 2020 British television drama
 "Honor" (The Walking Dead), a 2018 episode of The Walking Dead

Education 
 Latin honors, distinctions of academic degrees
 Honors student, student recognized for high achievement in their academics
 Honours degree, educational term with various meanings

Other uses 
 Honor (brand), a smartphone brand based in China
 Honor, Michigan, United States
 Honour (feudal barony), feudal barony in medieval England
 Honour (style), a pre-nominal honorific typically used for judges and mayors
 Honors (horse), a champion show horse
 Honor, a high-valued card in 
 Honors, in bridge scoring, a bonus for the holding of high-valued cards

See also
Honor system or trust system, a philosophical way of running a variety of endeavors 
Matter of Honour (disambiguation)
Medal of Honor (disambiguation)
 
 
Orders, decorations, and medals of Canada
Honours of Scotland
Orders, decorations, and medals of the United Kingdom
Honours of the Principality of Wales